The seaboard goby (Gobiosoma ginsburgi) is a species of fish belonging to the family Gobiidae.

Description 
The seaboard goby has a long pelvic disk that reaches most of the distance of the pelvic fin to the ventral fin. It has 12 dorsal rays modally. It can be colored from a pale, translucent shade to a darker brown.

Distribution and habitat
The seaboard goby occurs on the Atlantic Coast of the United States, ranging north from Massachusetts to Georgia, being recorded most frequently from New Jersey to the southern end of its range. Although it has been recorded to be found up to depths of 45m, it is more commonly found in the depth range of 2–9 m deep.

Reproduction and Development 
Spawning for the seaboard goby occurs during the summer season beginning at age 1 in the southern portions of its range, and progressively continues northward as the season goes on. Eggs and hatching size have not been observed.

Name
The specific name honors the American ichthyologist and taxonomist of gobies, Isaac Ginsburg (1886-1975), who was a colleague of the Hildebrand's and Schroeder's at the  U.S. National Museum.

References 

1.	Smith, L. C. The Inland Fishes of New York State. New York: The New York State Department of Environmental Conservation. 1985, pp. 443, 444.

ginsburgi
Fish described in 1928